The 2016 Puerto Rico FC season was the club's first season of existence. The club played in North American Soccer League, the second tier of the American soccer pyramid, enter only in the Fall season in which they finished 9th.

After winning the Copa Luis Villarejo on November 20; Puerto Rico FC qualified for the 2017 CFU Club Championship with matches taking place in the coming-up 2017 season.

Season review

Commitment to the Community

As part of their commitment to the community in May 2016, Puerto Rico FC had their first three clinics of the season in Dorado, Farjardo and Hatillo with the participation of over a hundred boys and girls. During these clinics the Puerto Rico FC players turned into coaches, teaching the children about ball control, proper goalkeeping and teamwork. After the different workshops the children faced off against the players in a friendly match. The field of Quintas de Dorado was the site of the first clinic with youth clubs Eleven FC and Toa Baja SC. Next, Puerto Rico FC visited the Tomás Donés Sports Complex and the boys and girls of Cariduros FC. To round up the first leg of clinics the players took a trip to the city of Hatillo where they trained with Hatillo SC and Leal Arecibo in the Francisco Deida Sports Complex.

Clásico de Fútbol

As part of the Puerto Rican Day Parade weekend celebration, Puerto Rico FC will travel to New York City to meet the Puerto Rico national team in a friendly match. This match is part of PRFC’s ongoing preseason and build up to their inaugural match at the Juan Ramón Loubriel Stadium next July 2 in Bayamón, Puerto Rico.

Roster

Transfers

In

Out

Loans in

Friendlies

Pre-season

Competitions

NASL Fall season

Standings

Results summary

Results by round

Matches

Copa Luis Villarejo

Quarterfinals

Semifinals

Final

Squad statistics

Appearances and goals

|-
|colspan="14"|Players who appeared for Puerto Rico who left the club during the season:
|}

Goal scorers

Disciplinary record

References

External links
 

Puerto Rico FC
American soccer clubs 2016 season
2016 North American Soccer League season